Paris Saint-Germain Football Club have had 31 managers, of whom 17 have won at least one trophy. French coach and former player Christophe Galtier is the current manager. He has been in charge since July 2022. Pierre Phelipon, appointed in August 1970, was the club's first manager. He was also one of two player-managers in their history, the other being Jean-Michel Larqué. Phelipon guided the Parisians to their maiden trophy, the Ligue 2 title, in 1971.

Georges Peyroche coached PSG for three years and seven months, being their longest-serving manager. He led Paris to consecutive French Cup victories in 1982 and 1983, the club's first major titles. In 1986, Gérard Houllier became the first manager to make PSG champions of France. Artur Jorge, Carlo Ancelotti, Laurent Blanc, Unai Emery, Thomas Tuchel and Mauricio Pochettino have since added further league titles.

Laurent Blanc is the club's most successful manager in terms of trophies won, with eleven. In his three campaigns on the bench, Paris won the league and league cup double once and the domestic quadruple twice, which translates into three Ligue 1 titles, two French Cups, three French League Cups and three French Super Cups. Next is Unai Emery with one domestic quadruple, one domestic cup double and another super cup, for a total of seven trophies. Thomas Tuchel completes the podium, with six. He clinched the domestic quadruple once in addition to separate league and super cup titles. Most notably, he steered PSG to their first UEFA Champions League final in 2020, narrowly losing to Bayern Munich.

Former PSG players Luis Fernández, Ricardo and Mauricio Pochettino also enjoyed different levels of success as managers. Fernández won five trophies in two separate spells at the Parc des Princes. He led the Red and Blues to their two European titles, the UEFA Cup Winners' Cup in 1996 and the UEFA Intertoto Cup in 2001, as well as the domestic cup double and the French Super Cup in 1995. He holds the club record for most games managed, with 244. Ricardo lost two European finals, the 1996 UEFA Super Cup and the 1997 UEFA Cup Winners' Cup Final, but guided PSG to the domestic cup double in 1998. Under helm of Pochettino, the club won its 10th league title, one French Cup and one French Super Cup.

Managers

As of 19 March 2023.

Honours

As of the 2022 Trophée des Champions.

Footnotes

References

External links

Official websites
PSG.FR - Site officiel du Paris Saint-Germain
Paris Saint-Germain - Ligue 1
Paris Saint-Germain - UEFA.com

 
Paris Saint-Germain F.C.
Paris Saint-Germain F.C. managers